Ventilla Airport  is a high-elevation airport serving the San Cristóbal silver mine and its supporting town in the Potosí Department of Bolivia. San Cristóbal is within the Bolivian Altiplano, and there is high terrain north and south of the runway.

See also

Transport in Bolivia
List of airports in Bolivia

References

External links 
OpenStreetMap - San Cristóbal
OurAirports - Toldos
Fallingrain - Toldos Airport

Airports in Potosí Department